Blapleu (also known as Bafléso) is a town in western Ivory Coast. It is a sub-prefecture of Biankouma Department in Tonkpi Region, Montagnes District.

Blapleu was a commune until March 2012, when it became one of 1126 communes nationwide that were abolished.

In 2014, the population of the sub-prefecture of Blapleu was 14,750.

Villages
The seven villages of the sub-prefecture of Blapleu and their population in 2014 are:
 Blapleu (5 420)
 Gama (2 422)
 Gbéné (790)
 Gouélé (1 499)
 Guégouin (344)
 Klapleu (2 103)
 Zantongouin (2 172)

Notes

Sub-prefectures of Tonkpi
Former communes of Ivory Coast